Per Egil Evensen (born 28 October 1950) is a Norwegian politician for the Progress Party.

He served as a deputy representative to the Norwegian Parliament from Østfold during the term 2005–2009.

He has been a member of Halden municipal council.

References

1950 births
Living people
Deputy members of the Storting
Progress Party (Norway) politicians
Østfold politicians
People from Halden
Place of birth missing (living people)
21st-century Norwegian politicians